Hámilton Ricard Cuesta (born 12 January 1974) is a Colombian former footballer who played as a striker. He played for clubs in 10 different countries over the course of his career, including Colombian sides Deportivo Cali, Cortuluá, Independiente Santa Fe and Deportes Quindío, English club Middlesbrough, CSKA Sofia in Bulgaria, Emelec in Ecuador, Japanese side Shonan Bellmare, APOEL in Cyprus, Spanish side Numancia, Uruguayan club Danubio and Concepción in Chile.

Career
Ricard was signed for Middlesbrough by manager Bryan Robson for a fee of £2 million in 1998. He signed his signature on a napkin because Middlesbrough had no documents. Over a four-year Middlesbrough career, he scored 33 goals in 115 appearances. He was twice Middlesbrough's top scorer. When Steve McClaren took over the reins, Ricard was deemed surplus to requirements and allowed to move to CSKA Sofia on a free transfer. After one season in Bulgaria, Ricard moved to Japan, where he joined Second Division side Shonan Bellmare.

Since leaving Middlesbrough, Ricard courted controversy both on and off the pitch. In 2002, he was involved in a car accident that killed a passenger, and was banned from football for 12 months for attacking a referee and making obscene gestures to the crowd while playing for Guayaquil side Emelec. The ban was reduced on appeal, and since then, Ricard attempted to move back to Europe to rejuvenate his career. He briefly played in Cyprus for APOEL, before signing a year's deal with Numancia for the 2005–06 season. He played 16 times, scoring two goals.

After he moved to Danubio in Uruguay where he scored 12 goals and was voted as one of their best players of the decade. In June 2007 he trialled with Chinese Super League team Shanghai Shenhua, subsequently signing a contract with the Chinese club.

Ricard has represented Colombia 27 times, scoring five goals.

Club statistics

Personal life
Ricard has a daughter.

International goals

Honours

Club
Shanghai Shenhua:
A3 Champions Cup: 2007

References

External links

1974 births
Living people
People from Quibdó
Colombian footballers
Colombian expatriate footballers
Colombia international footballers
Association football forwards
1997 Copa América players
1998 FIFA World Cup players
1999 Copa América players
Deportivo Cali footballers
Middlesbrough F.C. players
PFC CSKA Sofia players
Shonan Bellmare players
Cortuluá footballers
C.S. Emelec footballers
APOEL FC players
Danubio F.C. players
CD Numancia players
Shanghai Shenhua F.C. players
Deportes Concepción (Chile) footballers
Deportes Quindío footballers
Categoría Primera A players
Premier League players
Chinese Super League players
First Professional Football League (Bulgaria) players
Cypriot First Division players
Segunda División players
English Football League players
J2 League players
Uruguayan Primera División players
Ecuadorian Serie A players
Colombian expatriate sportspeople in Bulgaria
Colombian expatriate sportspeople in Chile
Colombian expatriate sportspeople in China
Expatriate footballers in Spain
Expatriate footballers in Cyprus
Expatriate footballers in Bulgaria
Expatriate footballers in China
Expatriate footballers in Chile
Expatriate footballers in Ecuador
Expatriate footballers in Japan
Expatriate footballers in England
Colombian expatriate sportspeople in Spain
Colombian expatriate sportspeople in England
Colombian expatriate sportspeople in Japan
Sportspeople from Chocó Department
Footballers at the 1995 Pan American Games
Pan American Games bronze medalists for Colombia
Pan American Games medalists in football
Medalists at the 1995 Pan American Games